The 1947–48 Duke Blue Devils men's basketball team represented Duke University during the 1947–48 men's college basketball season. The head coach was Gerry Gerard, coaching his sixth season with the Blue Devils. The team finished with an overall record of 17–12.

References 

Duke Blue Devils men's basketball seasons
Duke
1947 in sports in North Carolina
1948 in sports in North Carolina